Gemmuloborsonia didyma is a species of sea snail, a marine gastropod mollusk in the family Turridae.

Description
The length of the shell attains , its diameter .

Distribution

References

External links
 * Sysoev, Alexander, and Philippe Bouchet. "Taxonomic reevaluation of Gemmuloborsonia Shuto, 1989 (Gastropoda: Conoidea), with a description of new Recent deep-water species." Journal of Molluscan Studies 62.1 (1996): 75–87
 Holotype of Gemmuloborsonia didyma at MNHN, Paris)

didyma
Gastropods described in 1996